Eustatius served as Greek Patriarch of Alexandria between 813 and 817.

References
 

9th-century Patriarchs of Alexandria
9th-century people from the Abbasid Caliphate